David Huffman (1945–1985) was an American actor.

David Huffman may also refer to:
 David A. Huffman (1925–1999), computer science pioneer
 Dave Huffman (1957–1998), American football player
 David Huffman (artist) (born 1963), American painter and installation artist